Areeiro is a station on the Green Line of the Lisbon Metro serving the Areeiro neighbourhood. The station is located in the Praça Francisco Sá Carneiro, just south of the Roma-Areeiro railway station.

History
The station was designed by the architect Denis Gomes with art installations by the painter Maria Keil.

Connections

Urban buses

Carris 
 206 Cais do Sodré ⇄ Senhor Roubado (Metro) (morning service)
 208 Cais do Sodré ⇄ Estação Oriente (Interface) (morning service)
 705 Estação Oriente (Interface) ⇄ Estação Roma-Areeiro
 708 Martim Moniz ⇄ Parque das Nações Norte
 717 Praça do Chile ⇄ Fetais
 720 Picheleira / Rua Faria Vasconcelos ⇄ Calvário
 722 Praça de Londres ⇄ Portela - Rua dos Escritores
 727 Estação Roma-Areeiro ⇄ Restelo - Av. das Descobertas
 735 Cais do Sodré ⇄ Hospital Santa Maria
 756 Olaias ⇄ Rua da Junqueira
 793 Marvila ⇄ Estação Roma-Areeiro

Aerobus 
 Linha 1 Aeroporto ⇄ Cais do Sodré

Suburban buses

Rodoviária de Lisboa 
 319 Lisboa (Areeiro) ⇄ Alverca (Zona Industrial)
 320 Lisboa (Areeiro) ⇄ Alverca (Estação) via Forte da Casa
 321 Lisboa (Areeiro) ⇄ Via Rara

Transportes Sul do Tejo 
 160 Almada ⇄ Lisboa (Praça do Areeiro) (via Alcântara)
 161 Costa de Caparica ⇄ Lisboa (Praça do Areeiro) (via Alcântara)
 190 Charneca de Caparica ⇄ Lisboa (Praça do Areeiro)

Rail

Comboios de Portugal 
 Sintra ⇄ Lisboa - Oriente
 Sintra ⇄ Alverca
 Alcântara-Terra ⇄ Castanheira do Ribatejo

Fertagus 
 Setúbal ⇄ Roma-Areeiro
 Coina ⇄ Roma-Areeiro

See also
 List of Lisbon metro stations

References

External links

Green Line (Lisbon Metro) stations
Railway stations opened in 1972